Olson Mountain,  also known as Mount Olson, is a  7,913-foot-elevation (2,412 m) mountain summit located in the Livingston Range, of Glacier National Park in the U.S. state of Montana. The mountain was named for a surveyor on the International Boundary Survey, with the name officially adopted in 1929. The nearest higher peak is Campbell Mountain,  to the north, and Citadel Peaks is two miles (3.2 km) to the south. Precipitation runoff from the mountain drains into Olson Creek before it empties to Waterton Lake.

Climate
Based on the Köppen climate classification, Olson Mountain is located in a subarctic climate zone characterized by long, usually very cold winters, and short, cool to mild summers. Temperatures can drop below −10° F with wind chill factors below −30° F.

Geology

Like other mountains in Glacier National Park, Olson Mountain is composed of sedimentary rock laid down during the Precambrian to Jurassic periods.

Gallery

See also
 List of mountains and mountain ranges of Glacier National Park (U.S.)
 Geology of the Rocky Mountains

References

External links
 Weather forecast: Olson Mountain
 National Park Service web site: Glacier National Park

Livingston Range
Mountains of Glacier County, Montana
Mountains of Glacier National Park (U.S.)
Mountains of Montana
North American 2000 m summits